Ostrusha Nunatak (‘Nunatak Ostrusha’ \'nu-na-tak o-'stru-sha\) is the rocky hill of elevation 841 m projecting from the ice cap in the northeastern periphery of Sentinel Range in Ellsworth Mountains, Antarctica.  It is named after the Thracian mound of Ostrusha in Southern Bulgaria.

Location
US mapping in 1961.

Maps
 Newcomer Glacier.  Scale 1:250 000 topographic map.  Reston, Virginia: US Geological Survey, 1961.
 Antarctic Digital Database (ADD). Scale 1:250000 topographic map of Antarctica. Scientific Committee on Antarctic Research (SCAR). Since 1993, regularly updated.

Notes

References
 Ostrusha Nunatak. SCAR Composite Gazetteer of Antarctica
 Bulgarian Antarctic Gazetteer. Antarctic Place-names Commission. (details in Bulgarian, basic data in English)

External links
 Ostrusha Nunatak. Copernix satellite image

Ellsworth Mountains
Bulgaria and the Antarctic
Nunataks of Ellsworth Land